Warrior by a Tomb, Arab by a Tomb or The Arab by the Tomb is an 1838 oil on canvas painting by Eugène Delacroix, now in the Hiroshima Museum of Art. It was inspired by his trip to Morocco as an official painter, but was refused by the jury of the Paris Salon.

References 

1838 paintings
Paintings by Eugène Delacroix
Horses in art
Orientalist paintings